Thagini (The Lady Thug) is a Bengali suspense drama film directed by Tarun Majumdar based on a short story of Subodh Ghosh. This film was released on 13 December 1974 in the banner of Chaya O Chabi Production. Music of the film was scored by Hemanta Mukherjee

Plot
Cashier Haripada was ditched by his friend Rajen Mukherjee. He breaks the office locker with his assistant Banku but caught. They need money for the marriage of Haripada's daughter Karabi. After two years they become released from jail and without having any means start looting money. Karabi marries a man with the help of Haripada and Banku, then she escapes with all jewelry of her husband. The three fool the police and go to Kolkata. In Kolkata, Karabi meets an innocent youngman Amit who is actually the son of Rajen Mukherjee. Haripada wants to take revenge, but his daughter falls in love with Amit.

Cast
 Utpal Dutt
 Sandhya Roy as Karabi
Ajitesh Bandopadhyay
 Chinmoy Roy
 Robi Ghosh
Anup Kumar
Jahor Roy
Shekhar Chattopadhyay
Tapen Chatterjee
Shobha Sen
 Bankim Ghosh
 Biren Chattopadhyay
 Haridhan Mukhopadhyay
 Juin Banerjee

References

External links
 

1974 films
Bengali-language Indian films
Films based on Indian novels
Films scored by Hemant Kumar
Indian drama films
Indian romantic thriller films
1970s Bengali-language films
1970s romantic thriller films
Films about cults